The World Group II was the second highest level of Fed Cup competition in 1998. Winning nations advanced to the World Group Play-offs, and the losing nations were demoted to the World Group II Play-offs.

Italy vs. Austria

Australia vs. Russia

Croatia vs. Japan

Argentina vs. Slovakia

References

See also
Fed Cup structure

World Group II